The Indian cricket team toured Zimbabwe from 24 July 2013 to 3 August 2013. The tour consisted of five One Day Internationals. India won the series 5-0. It was their first 5-0 ODI series sweep in an away series.

Venues
The first three one-dayers were played in Harare Sports Club, Harare, and the last two in Queens Sports Club, Bulawayo.

Squads

ODI series

1st ODI

2nd ODI

3rd ODI

4th ODI

5th ODI

Statistics

Batting
Most runs

Bowling
Most wickets

Broadcasting Rights

References

External links

2013 in Indian cricket
2013 in Zimbabwean cricket
2013
International cricket competitions in 2013
Zimbabwean cricket seasons from 2000–01